The Montreal Youth Symphony Orchestra is a youth orchestra in Montreal, Quebec, Canada.

The orchestra was created in 1976, with the artistic director Louis Lavigueur, C.Q joined in 1986. The orchestra is a member of the Association des orchestres de jeunes du Québec, and Orchestras Canada. It became a major actor in Montreal's educational and cultural web over the time.

See also 
 List of youth orchestras

References

External links
 Official site, in French

Canadian orchestras
Musical groups from Montreal
Youth orchestras